Holophaea is a genus of moths in the subfamily Arctiinae. The genus was erected by George Hampson in 1898.

Species
 Holophaea caerulea Druce, 1898
 Holophaea cardinalis Rothschild, 1911
 Holophaea endoleuca Dognin, 1909
 Holophaea erharda Schaus, 1927
 Holophaea eurytorna Hampson, 1914
 Holophaea gentilicia Schaus, 1911
 Holophaea lugens E. D. Jones, 1908
 Holophaea lycone Druce, 1884
 Holophaea melita Druce, 1899
 Holophaea prometina Druce, 1894
 Holophaea ruatana Druce, 1897
 Holophaea vesta Möschler, 1877

References

External links

Euchromiina
Moth genera